Celtic won the 1985–86 Scottish Premier Division and became champions in one of the closest finishes in League history. On the final day of the season Hearts were leading Celtic by two points - a draw against Dundee would have been sufficient to see them win their first League title since the 1959–60 season. Hearts lost 2–0 to Dundee at Dens Park thanks to two late goals by substitute Albert Kidd, while Celtic beat St Mirren 5–0 at Love Street. As a result, Celtic won the league on goal difference.

Relegation was suspended due to league reconstruction, therefore Motherwell and Clydebank retained their Premier Division status.

Much of the season was only viewed by fans in stadiums as a dispute between television companies and the Scottish Football League resulted in no televised Scottish league football between September 1985 and March 1986.

Table

Results

Matches 1–18
During matches 1–18 each team plays every other team twice (home and away).

Matches 19–36
During matches 19–36 each team plays every other team twice (home and away).

References

Scottish Premier Division seasons
1
Scot